Gina Matthews is an American film and television producer and writer, whose credits include the horror film Urban Legend, "What Women Want," "13 Going on 30" and "Isn't It Romantic."

Biography
Matthews was born in San Francisco and raised in Eugene, Oregon. Her mother, Yolanda, was an Italian immigrant, originally from Naples, and her father worked as a butcher. Matthews graduated from North Eugene High School in 1986 before earning a degree from the University of Oregon in 1990.

Career 
After relocating to Los Angeles, Matthews produced her first film, the cult slasher film Urban Legend (1998), which she developed with writer Silvio Horta. For 1999's Summer's End, Matthews won an Emmy Award for Outstanding Children's Special, shared with co-producers Frank Siracusa, Connie Tavel, and Patrick Whitely.

In 2003, Matthews produced the unaired pilot for FX titled Fubar, concerning military recruits at the U.S.-Mexico border. The following year, she produced the romantic comedy 13 Going on 30 (2004), starring Jennifer Garner. In 2008, she produced the television pilot The Oaks, and the television film Blue Blood, directed by Brett Ratner. Most recently, Matthews produced  the comedy film Isn't It Romantic (2019), starring Rebel Wilson.

She is the founder, alongsider her husband, producer Grant Scharbo, of Little Engine Productions.

Filmography

Producer

Writer

References

External links

1968 births
Living people
American people of Italian descent
American women film producers
Film producers from Oregon
Writers from Eugene, Oregon
University of Oregon alumni
American women television producers
Businesspeople from Eugene, Oregon
Television producers from Oregon
21st-century American women